Magomed Hozhakhmedovich Daudov (nicknamed Lord, born 26 February 1980) is a military and political figure of the Chechen Republic. He was put as the First Deputy Chairman of the Chechen Republic government from 2010 until 2012, manager of administration of the Head and Government of the Chechen Republic from 2011 until 2015, and was assigned as the Chairman of the Parliament in 2016.

Daudov participated in both the First and Second Chechen Wars. During the latter, he switched sides to the side of the Russian government. He worked in the security service of Akhmad Kadyrov (2002–2004), commanded a police force battalion of the Ministry of Internal Affairs (2004–2005), was Chief of Staff for Republican OMON (2006–2007), and Chief of the Shalinsky District Department of Internal Affairs (2007–2010).

Journalists have called Daudov the second-most influential person in the Chechen Republic after Kadyrov and often carries out "special orders" of the Head of the Chechen Republic. He is a police colonel and a member of the Presidium of the regional political council for the party United Russia. He was awarded the Order of Courage twice (2005, 2006), the Order of Kadyrov (2006), the rank of "Honorary Citizen of the Chechen Republic" (2007) and Hero of the Russian Federation (2007).

Early life 
Daudov was born on 26 February 1980 in the village Shpakovskoe, Stavropolsky Region to Hozhakhmed Abdulvakhabovich Daudov and Makka Uvaysovna Daudova. His father was from the village of Geldagan in Kurchaloyevsky District. Daudov was the family's first child. His brother Sheykhmagomed was born in 1981 and his sister Milana was born in 1985.

Education 
In 1997 he left Secondary School № 1 in the village of Geldagan. Class teacher H.M. Abdurzakova recollects: "Magomed was intellectually inquisitive and gifted for his years as a boy. Despite his young age, he was very persistent and dedicated." From 1997 to 1999, he studied at the Gudermes Pedagogical Training School.

Participation in the military conflict 
At the beginning of the First Chechen War, Daudov was 14. As with many other young Chechens, he was involved in armed conflicts with Russian troops. In an interview in 2010, Daudov stated his point of view about the reasons why Chechens were forced to participate in the war. One reason he called ”tough cleaning of federal troops” — the Russian military saw the potential enemy in any young local resident. Some sources report that until 2002 he was in the ranks of illegal armed formations while, others claim that in 2000 he joined the forces of the Russian Federation and served there until 2002.

According to official sources, at the beginning of the Second Chechen War Daudov sided with the Kadyrov-led government forces.

Daudov recollects "when Akhmad-Hadji announced the amnesty, I hid at my aunt's. There was no blood on me and I came out of the wood at once, as did thousands of other guys. After a conversation with R.A. Kadyrov, I was amnestied."

During one of his speeches, Kadyrov spoke of Daudov as a positive example of an improved fighter. In 2002-2004, Daudov served as commander of a platoon in Kadyrov's security service.

Military career 
In June 2004, Daudov began to serve as commander of Troop Regiment № 2 of a special purpose unit at the Ministry of Internal Affairs. In February 2005, he became the commander of a battalion of the security guard and patrol service of police for the Department of Internal Affairs across the Shalinsky district. In November 2006, he became a special investigative agent in the fight against kidnapping and human trafficking. Daudov organized special operations against groups of separatists and bands.

On 13 February 2006 he was involved in a special operation in Urus-Martan, where he killed the "emir of the village of Avtur," D. Abdurzakov. When Abdurzakov responded to the offer ”hand over” with automatic fire, Daudov reportedly broke into a house and killed the fighter. In September, 2006 he supervised and headed another special operation — the liquidation of the Muskiyev brothers. One brother, Isa, was considered to be a leader of armed separatist groups acting in the Argun, Shalinsky and Kurchaloyevsky districts.

In December 2006, Daudov was appointed deputy commander and chief of OMON staff of the Ministry of Internal Affairs. He personally participated in many fighting actions. Under his leadership OMON eliminated 46 notable criminals, blocked out 84 people and seized firearms, improvised explosive devices, electric detonators, artillery shells and mortar mines.

In April 2007, Daudov became the acting chief of the District Department of Internal Affairs (ROVD) in Shalinsky district and in September he officially became the chief. On 21 March 2007, Daudov organized liquidation of the brigade general in Gudermes, who commanded the Northeast front of Chechen Republic of Ichkeria.

Daudov killed the vice-premiere, S.E. Elmurzayev, who was responsible for the 9 May 2004 explosion in Grozny that killed Kadyrov, Chairman of the State Council of the Chechen Republic H. Isaev and four others. Daudov received operational information about Elmurzayev's location and organized an operation to eliminate him. On 4 April 2007, Elmurzayev was ambushed and killed by security officers in the village of Agishbatoy.

On 19 March 2009, Daudov was injured during a raid in Samashkinsky Street, Oktyabrsky District, Grozny.

On 3 August 2009, an attempt was made on Daudov's life. As his car left the village of Avtura, and an explosive detonated on the road. He was injured, but survived.

Political activity 
Daudov is an active government participant. Journalists call Daudov the "second person" in the Chechen Republic.

First Deputy Chairman 

On 10 March 2010, the Parliament of the Chechen Republic unanimously approved Daudov as First Deputy Chairman. In this position, he led commissions for issues in the republic including an interdepartmental commission on issues of Records and Registration of citizens in 2010. In November 2010, he led the reconstruction and development of Argun. In December 2011, Daudov led the special commission for organization of celebration of Ashura.

In 2011, Daudov graduated from the Federal State Educational Institution of Higher Professional Education MVD Administration Academy of Russia with a specialization in Jurisprudence.

First Assistant 
In December 2011, Daudov's position was changed to "The first Assistant of the Chairman of Government of the Chechen Republic — the Manager of Administration of the Head and the Government of the Chechen Republic", and on 21 May 2012 to "The Manager of Administration of the Head and the Government of the Chechen Republic". On 26 April 2012, Daudov became a member of the United Russia Party and a member of the Presidium of the Regional political Council of the Party. Later in 2012 he led the republican interdepartmental commission for control of observance of land legislation. In 2014, United Russia recognized his work as the best among Russian subjects.

Chairman of the Parliament 

On 3 July 2015, after the death of D. B. Abdurakhmano, the Speaker of the Parliament, Daudov was presented by the regional department of United Russia as a candidate for Chairman of the Parliament of the Chechen Republic of the III Convention. He was elected by secret vote. On 4 October 2016, he was elected Chairman of the Parliament of the Chechen Republic of the IV convention.

Under his leadership Parliament adopted laws concerning elections of the Head of the Chechen Republic, Development of a Small and Medium Entrepreneurship, Education, social service, mortgage housing lending, public order and others. In October 2016 he implemented a ban on the selling of alcoholic drinks in the republic.

Daudov is a member of the Council of Legislators of the Russian Federation at the Federal Assembly of the Russian Federation.

Non-parliamentary activity 

In 2016, Daudov supervised construction of the settlement Gush-Kert in Shatoysky District, which was destroyed by landslides. Since September, 2016, he has directed the republican operational headquarters seeking to decrease the vehicle crash and death rates.

Socio-political views 
In 2010, Daudov was interviewed by TV reporter Pavel Sheremet. He said, "All of us are citizens of Russia and we want to live in a strong and peaceful state… We stand for the law, for strong and United Russia. Now we have more order and it is more peaceful in Chechnya than in many other Russian regions".

In 2015, various articles discussed comments of Daudov concerning the legalization of polygamy. Daudov had stated his opinion with reference to a scandal concerning N. Guchigov's and H. L. Goylabiyeva wedding, which he attended. Daudov said that polygamy is practiced so it would be a good idea to settle such cases, preferably on the basis of Sharia, but emphasized that he would not take initiative to legalize polygamy.

Criticisms 

According to investigations by Novaya Gazeta and human rights organization Human Rights Watch, as a person in the inner circle of Kadyrov, Daudov often carries out his "special instructions".

In 2014, according to a Novaya Gazeta investigation, Daudov participated in the torture and beating of detained president of Assembly of the Caucasian people, R. Kutayev.

In 2015, Novaya Gazeta reported that Chechen authorities were concerned about "true news" about the republic, claiming that bloggers writing about Chechnya in a manner viewed as "incorrect" by the authorities were illegally pressured and forced to apologise. Daudov was mentioned in this context.

On 16 and 17 January 2016, Daudov made posts on his Instagram account that contained insults and veiled threats against members of the Russian opposition, including journalists and right activists (Alexei Venediktov, I.A. Kalyapin, K.E. Merzlikin, A.A. Navalny, L.A. Ponomaryov, M.B. Khodorkovsky, V.I. Shenderovich and I.V. Yashin. Editor-in-chief of Echo of Moscow A.A. Venediktov said: "Magomed Daudov's statements addressing to opposition - is a serious threat and inadequate reaction to inconvenient issues of murder of Boris Nemtsov and a question to investigation and Chechen authorities".

In a 12 October 2016 Instagram post, Daudov again made veiled insults against I.A. Kalyapin, chairman of interregional public organization Committee Against Torture. Gregory Shvedov, editor-in-chief of Online newspaper Caucasian Knot submitted an application to the Investigative Committee of Russia, trying to bring Daudov's publication under corpus delicti under article 144, part 3 of the Criminal Code of Russia. The Investigative Committee of Russia investigated but chose not to open a criminal case against Daudov.

Press articles covered Daudov's conflict with the acting Chairman of the Supreme Court of Chechnya T.A. Murdalov.

According to some journalists, on 6 October 2016, Daudov came to the Supreme Court of Chechnya accompanied by security, entered the office of acting Chairman T. A. Murdalov and began to beat him, demanding that he write the resignation letter for health reasons. Murdalov refused.

According to media and human rights activists, Daudov participated in the prosecution of homosexuals in Chechnya and "played the key role in cleaning of the republic from gays, which was approved by republican management". Journalists provided evidence that Daudov personally went to secret prisons in Argun and Grozny and managed the transfer of detained gays to relatives.

Personal life 

In 2001, Daudov married a fellow villager from Geldagen and former classmate, Aset Movlayevna. They have ten children, six boys and four girls.

In the Chechen Republic, Daudov has the nickname "Lord". This was given by Kadyrov after Daudov came to their first meeting in a black suit and white shirt, which Kadryov said made him look like an English lord.

Daudov plays football. On 11 May 2011 he played for the team "Caucasus" in a match against the national team "Stars of World Football" for the ceremony opening of Akhmat-Arena in Grozny. On October 7, 2015 he played for "Leader-63" in a friendly match against the national team legends of the Italian football, devoted to birthday of Russian President V.V. Putin. In 2004, Daudov became the vice-president of republican football club FC Akhmat Grozny, and in 2011 he became its president.

Daudov is an active user of social networks and often uses his Instagram and VKontakte accounts to spread information about political, public, sports and religious events.

Daudov is a follower of sheikh Kunta-hadzhi Kishiyev, professing hajjs-myuridizm (kadiriysky tariqa of Sufi, Islam). Daudov made a hajj to Mecca with Ramzan Kadyrov, entering the Kaaba several times. He collects sacred relics of the prophet Muhammad.

Awards and honors 

Daudov received multiple decorations of the Russian Federation and the Chechen Republic. 
 Hero of the Russian Federation, 25 July 2007, for courage and heroism in the line of duty as captain of police
 Gold Star Medal of Hero of Russia. Multiple sources claim that he received this medal for elimination of Deputy Prime Minister S.E. Elmurzayev.

State decoration

Departmental and commemorative medals

Badge of achievement

Awards of foreign countries

Street and school 
On 13 October 2007, by order of the head of administration of the village Geldagan, Titov Street was renamed into the Street of Hero of Russia M.H. Daudov.  In March, 2008 by Chechen Republic Presidential decree the secondary high school No. 1 of the village Geldagan, where Daudov studied, was named in his honor.

References 

1980 births
Living people
Child soldiers
Heroes of the Russian Federation
Recipients of the Medal of Zhukov
Recipients of the Order of Courage
Russian jurists
Russian Muslims
Russian Islamists